Off the Rails may refer to:

 Off the Rails (TV series), an Irish fashion magazine show
 Off the Rails (New Zealand TV series), a New Zealand TV show presented by Marcus Lush
 Off the Rails, a Railway Series book about Gordon the Big Engine
 Thrillville: Off the Rails, a theme park simulation video game
 Off the Rails (play), an adaptation of Shakespeare's Measure for Measure from a Native American perspective by Randy Reinholz
 Off the Rails (1921 film), a German silent drama film
 Off the Rails (2016 film), an American documentary film about Darius McCollum
 Off the Rails (2021 film), a British comedy-drama film